The Bhusawal Junction railway station (formerly Bhosawal) serves Bhusawal in the Jalgaon district of the Indian state of Maharashtra. The Bhusawal railway station is one of the top-100 booking stations of Indian Railways. Approximately fourteen trains originate at Bhusawal station with 289 trains servicing the railway stop.

History
The Bhusawal railway station was formally established in 1863. In 1866, the Great Indian Peninsula Railway (GIPR) branch line was extended to Khandwa and then to Nagpur in 1867. Bhusawal is a divisional headquarters under Central Railways. The Bhusawal railway station was built by the then British-run Indian government at a sum of £80,000 (8,00,000 Indian rupees) from 1852 to 1865. The station was built with a large bath, refreshment rooms, a large workshop, dwellings for European employees, reading rooms and gymkhana. The Bhusawal railway line was opened between 1861 and 1865.

Electrification
Railways in the Bhusawal area were electrified in 1968–69. Like other lines, the railway is powered by a single phase, 25 kV AC supply.

Amenities
Amenities at the Bhusawal railway station include an SBI ATM, reservation office, STD/PCO booth, waiting room, retiring room, vegetarian and non-vegetarian refreshments, information desk, post office, Wi-Fi, and more. The northern and southern entrances have separate ticketing windows. There is a free 4-wheeler parking area at the northern entrance. The Bhusawal railway station and ST stand. Elevators and electric vehicles are available for use by railway station passengers.

Locomotive shed
The locomotive shed at Bhusawal was established by the GIPR in 1919. At that time, it was the largest in Asia and the third-largest in the world.
The Electric Locomotive Workshop at Bhusawal was established in 1974 at a cost of ₹3.52 crores and performs periodical overhauls of electric locomotives. It is also the only workshop in India to perform overhauls of three-phase, induction motor-based trains.

The Bhusawal Locomotive Shed has been accredited with the International Standard Certificate ISO 9008-2000 since April 2006.

The shed has WAM-4, WAP- 4, WAG-5, and WAG-9 locomotives.

Gallery

References

External links
Departures from Bhusawal

Railway stations in Jalgaon district
Railway junction stations in Maharashtra
Bhusawal railway division
Railway stations opened in 1863
Transport in Bhusawal